The Liga de Fútbol Profesional Boliviano also known as La Liga is a Bolivian league for professional football clubs. It is the country's leading football competition and forms the highest level of the Bolivian football league system. The competition began in the 1977 season, when the country's top clubs broke away from The Bolivian Football Regional Leagues well known as Primera A. As of 2010, 34 Bolivian League seasons have been completed, although only four clubs have been crowned champions. Bolivar have won the league sixteen times, The Strongest eight times, Jorge Wiltermann and Blooming five times. The reigning champions are Oriente Petrolero, who won their fourth Liga title (fourth top division title) in the 2010 season.

Seasons

References